Gudhan is a Maldivian web series directed by Ibrahim Wisan. It stars Mohamed Afrah, Mohamed Shivaz, Dimitri Vergé, Azmee Adam Naseer, Mohamed Najah, Fathimath Visama and  Ali Inaz in main roles. The pilot episode of the series was released on 21 August 2022.

The series follows the lives of seven strangers who hide inside a go-down in the neighborhood to flee an unknown police raid at a massage parlor. With police zeroing in, tension, mistrust, and emotions run high inside the go-down as everyone turns against each other, and their past and present come peeling off layer by layer.

Cast and characters

Main
 Mohamed Afrah as Naseem
 Mohamed Shivaz as Izzuddin Solih
 Dimitri Vergé as Jean Pierre
 Azmee Adam Naseer as Hassan Firaz
 Mohamed Najah as Wahid
 Fathimath Visama as Nazneen
 Ali Inaz as Shuhurab Sodhiq

Recurring
 Myeha Adam as Dhanaa; Solih's wife
 Ansham Mohamed as Aisthu
 Ravee Farooq as Aisth's friend
 Shimal Hameed as Adeeb
 Dheena Ahmed as Zarana
 Delwar Hossen as Ali Almir
 Ahmed Sharif as Hossen
 Rex as Faathun

Guest
 Mariyam Haleem as Zarana's mom (Episode 1)
 Rushani Lewke Bandara as Lakshmi (Episode 1)
 Mariyam Shima as Sithu (Episode 6)
 Ahmed Alam as Yoosuf (Episode 11)
 Aisha Ali as Abidha (Episode 11)
 Aakil as child Solih (Episode 11)
 Hamdhan Farooq as Imran (Episode 12)
 Ahmed Jillian Rashad as Ihusan Saeed (Episode 12)

Episodes

Soundtrack

Release and reception
The first episode of the series was released on 21 August 2022 through Baiskoafu. Upon release, the series received positive response from critics. Ahmed Rasheed reviewing its fourth episode praised the screenplay and concept of the series for its "surprisingly good" deviation from the usual local contents.

References

Serial drama television series
Maldivian television shows
Maldivian web series